Iryanthera juruensis is a species of tree in the Myristaceae family. It is native to Panama and South America.

References

Trees of Peru
Myristicaceae